New Jersey's 13th Legislative District is one of 40 in the state, covering the Monmouth County municipalities of Aberdeen Township, Atlantic Highlands Borough, Fair Haven Borough, Hazlet Township, Highlands Borough, Holmdel Township, Keansburg Borough, Keyport Borough, Little Silver Borough, Marlboro Township, Middletown Township, Monmouth Beach Borough, Oceanport Borough, Rumson Borough, Sea Bright Borough and Union Beach Borough as of the 2011 apportionment.

Demographic characteristics
As of the 2020 United States census, the district had a population of 227,695, of whom 178,696 (78.5%) were of voting age. The racial makeup of the district was 181,986 (79.9%) White, 6,158 (2.7%) African American, 355 (0.2%) Native American, 17,581 (7.7%) Asian, 40 (0.0%) Pacific Islander, 5,858 (2.6%) from some other race, and 15,717 (6.9%) from two or more races. Hispanic or Latino of any race were 19,915 (8.7%) of the population.

The district had 183,388 registered voters as of December 1, 2021, of whom 74,386 (40.6%) were registered as unaffiliated, 56,393 (30.8%) were registered as Republicans, 50,499 (27.5%) were registered as Democrats, and 2,110 (1.1%) were registered to other parties.

Political representation
For the 2022–2023 session, the 13th Legislative District of the New Jersey Legislature is represented in the New Jersey Senate by Declan O'Scanlon (R, Little Silver) and in the General Assembly by Vicky Flynn (R, Holmdel Township) and Gerard Scharfenberger (R, Middletown Township).

The legislative district overlaps with New Jersey's 4th and 6th congressional districts.

1965–1973
In the interim period between the 1964 Supreme Court decision Reynolds v. Sims which required the creation of state legislature districts to be made as equal in population as possible and the 1973 creation of the 40-district map, the 13th District consisted of all of Bergen County. Senators were elected at-large from the entire county (four members in the 1965 election, five in the 1967 and 1971 elections) while the district was split into five Assembly districts that each elected two members.

The members elected to the Senate from this district are as follows:

The members elected to the Assembly from each district are as follows:

District composition since 1973
When the 40-district legislative map was created in 1973, the 13th district was located in the capital region of the state, only including Trenton and Hamilton Township in Mercer County. In the 1981 redistricting, the 13th was moved to encompass the northern Monmouth County shoreline (including Middletown Township, Hazlet, Matawan) and Old Bridge Township in Middlesex County. Following the 1991 redistricting, Matawan was removed but Spotswood in Middlesex County was added to the 13th. The district reverted to its 1981 configuration in 2001 with the exception of the addition of Holmdel. In the 2011 redistricting, the 13th District was located entirely in Monmouth County by removing Old Bridge and adding some of boroughs in the northeast corner of the county including Atlantic Highlands, Highlands, Monmouth Beach, and Oceanport.

Helen Chiarello Szabo took office in a November 1976 special election to succeed S. Howard Woodson, who resigned in September 197 6to head the New Jersey Civil Service Commission. In turn, Szabo stepped down in September 1978 to become the superintendent of elections in Mercer County and was succeeded in a November 1978 special election by Gerald R. Stockman.

Election history

Election results, 1973–present

Senate

General Assembly

Election results, 1965–1973

Senate

General Assembly

District 13A

District 13B

District 13C

District 13D

District 13E

References

Monmouth County, New Jersey
13